Susan Renee Smalley (born September 19, 1969) and Stacie Elisabeth Madison (born June 17, 1970) were two young women from Carrollton, Texas, of the United States who disappeared on the morning of March 20, 1988.

Disappearance
Stacie Madison worked as a receptionist and had plans of studying business at the University of North Texas. On the evening of March 19, 1988, her good friend, Susan Smalley, was staying overnight at her house. The pair left the house together for a short while in Madison's 1967 Ford Mustang convertible, a car that was painted in the emblematic colors of their high school and that Madison had recently bought with the earnings from her two jobs. Later, the girls were seen attempting to purchase alcohol at a 7-Eleven, but the clerk did not sell it to them since they were minors.

Madison and Smalley returned to the house, where Madison phoned a friend at around midnight. The girls left the house again shortly after the call, with Madison's car no longer to be seen parked in front of the house where the girls were staying. The last time anyone saw the girls, they were at The Steak and Ale, the same restaurant where Smalley worked as a waitress. An employee at the establishment told investigators that Smalley had been talking to another co-worker while Madison waited for her in the parked car.

Smalley and Madison were reported missing the next morning. The Mustang that they had been driving the previous night was found abandoned in the parking lot of a Dallas shopping center, together with personal belongings of both girls inside. When last seen, Madison was wearing white cotton pants and a white long-sleeved sweatshirt with a logo of pink and orange and white tennis shoes; Smalley was wearing a white sweater and blue jeans and was carrying a shoulder bag of navy blue with camel trim as well.

Investigation and aftermath

Several months after the two friends went missing, Smalley's last boyfriend confessed to a girl whom he was dating that he had killed Smalley and Madison by his own hand and then dumped their bodies in a local cemetery. After the girl shared this with police, Smalley's boyfriend underwent and passed a polygraph. He later relocated to Florida, moving from town to town in that state for over a decade and with attempts to contact him proving unsuccessful. For lack of better avenues to pursue in the case, detectives once consulted a psychic, only to be told that the girls were murdered by a blond-haired white male with glasses who was between 28 and 34 years old and who had dumped them near Grapevine Lake. However, a search of that area failed to turn up anything of value. The Susan Smalley and Stacie Madison case is still active.

In 2009, a book entitled This Night Wounds Time: The Mysterious Disappearances of Stacie Madison and Susan Smalley was self-published by Shawn Sutherland who grew up in Carrollton and was twenty-four when the girls mysteriously vanished. According to Sergeant Joel Payne, who is the lead detective with Carrollton police, the book caused the investigation to be renewed "start[ing] from scratch" not only in Carrollton, but in neighboring Denton County as well.

See also
List of people who disappeared

References

1980s missing person cases
1988 in Texas
History of Texas
History of women in Texas
March 1988 events in the United States
Missing American children
Missing person cases in Texas